Tobi 15 - Coptic Calendar - Tobi 17

The sixteenth day of the Coptic month of Tobi, the fifth month of the Coptic year. On a common year, this day corresponds to January 11, of the Julian Calendar, and January 24, of the Gregorian Calendar. This day falls in the Coptic Season of Shemu, the season of the Harvest.

Commemorations

Saints 

 The martyrdom of Saint Philotheos 
 The departure of Pope John IV, the 48th Patriarch of the See of Saint Mark

References 

Days of the Coptic calendar